Muhammad-Amin Asiyalav or Naib Emin Pasha (Avar: МухIаммад Амин Асиялав; ; 1818 – 8 April 1901) was a North Caucasian military commander and Islamic preacher of Avar origin who served as the 4th leader of the Circassian Confederation from 1848 to 1859. He was one of the Circassian leaders in the Russo-Circassian War and the third naib of Imam Shamil.

His era was marked with various reforms in industry, diplomacy, military, administration, religious issues and more. He gradually removed slavery, strictly banned social classes, built schools and small factories.

Biography

Early life

Family and name 
He was born in 1818 at the Gonoda region of Dagestan. His father was Honodiyaw Hajji, and his mother was Asiya. According to Imam Shamil, his father named him "Asiyalav Muhammad" meaning "Muhammad of Asiya".  

Imam Shamil, when writing to him in Arabic, addressed him as "ila Muhammaduna al-amin" (to our loyal Muhammad). The Circassians and Russians misunderstood these letters, and referred to him as "Muhammad Amin", believing Amin was his surname. Amin later adopted this name.

Youth and education 
After the death of his father at the age of 11, Amin began to lead a wandering lifestyle and indulged in teaching and learning. He studied the Quran and traveled from village to village. His first teacher was Diet-Bek, the judge of his village. His second teacher was Abdalrahman al-Sughuri. He also briefly went to Circassia, but returned to Dagestan in the 1830s.

Career

Meeting with Shamil 
In 1834 he entered the service of Imam Shamil as a volunteer and, due to his education, was always with him. Shamil first appointed him as the governor of Chechnya.

Arrival in Circassia 
In 1848, an event took place that significantly influenced the history of the Caucasus and the general course of the Russo-Circassian War. Ambassadors came to Shamil from the Abdzakh, one of the Circassian regions. They asked to be given a naib to be introduced to Islam properly and unite the peoples under the banner of the Imamate. Imam Shamil agreed to send Muhammad Amin in order to lead their struggle against the expansion of Russia. After learning that a warriorly scholar has arrived, thousands of families moved to the Abdzakh region to accept his rule.

Reforms 

Calling himself "Naib", he assumed full control over Circassia. His absolute rule was accepted by almost all Circassians. By the spring of 1849, the Abdzakh, Makhosh, Yegeruqway, and Chemguys declared their allegiance to the Naib; the Shapsugs along the Ubin River also promised support him with an alliance. The remaining small tribes had to power to resist him, and had to obey his orders.

Muhammad Amin believed that absolute authority was a necessity. He created a new order, "Nizam", based on holy values. He called every Circassian in the region between the ages of 15 and 60 and asked them to repeat the shahada in order to confirm that all his men are really Muslims. He later established courts, built mosques, schools, established laws and created a standing army. He sought the abolition of slavery and the feudal dependence of the peasants. His rule was based on an iron fist, and he did not hesitate to force others to join him with his army and empose brutal punishments on those who broke the laws.
He also started some industrialization works. He called polish experts to build small-scale factories, and established sub-districts of 100 families, led by governors. The duty of a governor was to carry out the orders given from above and to place the desired number of armed warriors under the command of the Naib. A scholar and a judge were also in charge of the district. Above them was an upper house where he and his closest relatives were present. The residence of Muhammad-Amin was in the district of Khadzhokh. His time also saw more importance paid to diplomacy, as he sent representatives to Istanbul and other parts of the world. 

In a short time, Naib succeeded in carrying out reforms in Circassia. He brought the Murtaziq units, previously used in Dagestan, to Circassia with a strategy of releasing prisoners of war in exchange for their conversion to Islam and loyalty.

Amin then started to use this small private army as a tool of pressure to keep his rule. As a result of Imam Shamil's demands for a more effective struggle, he disrupted the general strategy of the Circassians to stay on the defensive and directed 101 attacks against the Russian positions throughout 1849. The Russians, in turn, retaliated more severely against all Circassians.

Rebellions 
The Russians, worried about Amin's rise strengthening Circassia, supported the opposition via arms supplies and financial support, as well as promises of high ranks as long as they topple Amin and submit Circassia to Russia. Despite the ongoing Russo-Circassian War, the opposition, mostly made up of nobles who lost their power, accepted these proposals. A significant part of the population, especially those who submitted recently, began to ignore the Naib's orders, causing the administrative system of Circassia to collapse.

Naib began to impose harsh punishments against those who refused to obey him, which further increased tensions. The people, led by the Russian-backed opposition leaders, set fire to government buildings and expelled the Naib's personal army from the region.

Amin lost all of his former power and prestige when he was defeated by the Russians in the Unbi (Umpa) Mountains. On July 16, 1851, the Shapsug region decided to remove all the clergy who were pro-Amin from the administration.

Civil war 
After the Crimean War started and the Ottomans joined the war against the Russians, Muhammad Amin took advantage of this to re-instate his rule. He managed to re-gain control in some parts of his former lands, and strengthened his rule further. On 9 October 1853, the Ottoman Sultan sent a letter to Imam Shamil and suggested that he should declare a holy war against Russia. Muhammad Amin took it upon himself to lead the Circassian part of this holy war, and started mobilising against Russia. He started enlisting more soldiers.

Meanwhile, the Ottoman Empire, who wanted a Circassian puppet government and did not recognize Muhammad Amin as the ruler of Circassia, was preparing to send Seferbiy Zaneqo (Zanzade Sefer Bey), a former Circassian commander in the Russo-Circassian War who had declared loyalty to the sultan, to lead Circassia instead. Muhammad Amin strictly disagreed with this decision and complained to the Ottoman Grand Vizier in a letter and asked the Ottomans to recognize him. Muhammad Amin's complaint was rejected, and Seferbiy was declared as a pasha, and the leader of Circassians.

Amin believed that the Ottomans were actually his enemies attempting to weaken his influence rather than assist him im any way. He went to Varna to declare his worries, and went to Istanbul to talk with the Sultan himself. The Sultan, on the condition that he becomes an Ottoman vassal, declared him a pasha as well, and called him "Naib Emin Pasha". 

This led to an even more complex situation, as the Ottomans now recognized two different rulers of Circassia. Each one boasted about his own recognition, resulting in rising tensions. Although Zaneqo was completely loyal to the Sultan, Amin was only loyal in name, and continued to obey Imam Shamil, rather than the Sultan.  

In March 1855, near the river of Shebzh, the first battle between Muhammad Amin and Seferbiy Zaneqo took place. In May 1856 another battle took place on the banks of the Sup River. In January 1857, the followers of Amin and Zaneqo fought again near Tuapse, and both sides suffered casualties. 

In May 1857, Muhammad Amin returned to Istanbul. He was then arrested at the request of the Russian ambassador and exiled to Damascus. In September 1857, he escaped and returned to Circassia. He made some final efforts to establish authority, but failed. Russian-backed opposition leaders managed to remove Amin from power. Naib's army, the Murtaziqs, tried to gain power, but were defeated by the Abdzakh opposition. The Russian military, making use of the turmoil, quickly annexed the Abdzakh region, but did not keep any of the promises given to the Abdzakh opposition leaders. After the annexation of the region, most Abdzakh Circassians were forced to a death march in the winter as part of the Circassian genocide.

Surrender 
In 1859, after Imam Shamil surrendered, Muhammad Amin, who now lost all control, was preassured by Russia to officially surrender, and was offered a lifelong wage as long as he surrenders. Amin, who now had no power or allies left, went to a Russian military camp and declared his surrender and moved to Turkey. Seferbiy Zaneqo, however, could not make use of this to increase his authority, as he lost the support of the Ottomans and died a year later from wounds received in battle.

Death 
Muhammad Amin Asiyalav died in 1901 in Bursa, Ottoman Empire due to natural causes.

References

Avar people
1901 deaths
1818 births
People from the Ottoman Empire of Circassian descent
North Caucasian independence activists
People of the Caucasian War
Circassian military personnel of the Russo-Circassian War